"Amur gawa no ryuketsu ya" (Amūru gawa no ryūketsu ya, lit. The lyrics were based on the Amur River Incident.

Lyrics

References 

Japanese-language songs
1901 songs